Hetaerina miniata, the red-striped rubyspot is a damselfly in the family Calopterygidae.  The species was first described by Edmond de Sélys Longchamps in 1879

References

Calopterygidae
Species described in 1879